Francis Moore Dimond (June 6, 1796 – April 12, 1859) was an American politician and the 23rd Governor of Rhode Island.

Biography
Dimond was born in Bristol, Rhode Island on June 6, 1796. During his youth, he traveled to the Caribbean and served for several years (1832-1835) as the United States consul at Port-au-Prince.

From 1842 to 1849, Dimond was United States Consul to the Mexican port city of Veracruz. The knowledge he acquired there proved invaluable during the war with Mexico. During the war with Mexico, he was called to Washington to provide information that would help in the attack on Veracruz. After the battle, the United States Army occupied the area. At the time, Dimond served as an official interpreter for General Winfield Scott. He also became  a collector of the Port of Veracruz.

When he returned to Rhode Island, he promoted the Southern Pacific Railway and presided over its construction. He was elected lieutenant governor of Rhode Island in 1853. He became the governor of Rhode Island when Philip Allen resigned to become a Senator. He held the governor's office from July 20, 1853 to May 2, 1854. He was unsuccessful in his re-election bid. He died on April 12, 1859. Dimond was buried in the Juniper Hill Cemetery.

Francis M. Dimond House
In 1838, pre-eminent architect Russell Warren designed a home for Dimond on Hope Street in Bristol. It was one of a set of three Greek Revival houses designed by Warren within 50 feet of each other. Dimond's house was the most expensive of the three, and Dimond went bankrupt and sold it the year it was finished. The home still stands in Bristol.

References

External links

Sources 
 Sobel, Robert and John Raimo. Biographical Directory of the Governors of the United States, 1789-1978. Greenwood Press, 1988. 

1796 births
1859 deaths
Democratic Party governors of Rhode Island
People from Bristol, Rhode Island
Burials at Juniper Hill Cemetery
Lieutenant Governors of Rhode Island
19th-century American politicians